Mary Lyon (1797–1849) was a pioneering American educator.

Mary Lyon is also the name of:

Mary F. Lyon (1925–2014), English geneticist
Mary Lyon (writer) American columnist, political commentator and jewelry designer

See also
Mary Lyons (born 1947), British writer, Mills and Boon
Lyon (disambiguation)